The Victor is a 1923 American silent romantic comedy film directed by Edward Laemmle and starring Herbert Rawlinson, Frank Currier and Esther Ralston.

Synopsis
The Englishman Cecil Fitzhugh Waring is sent to America by his father Lord Waring to save the family's finances by marrying the daughter of a chewing gum tycoon. Unwilling to go through with the plan, he wanders the streets and meets a struggling actress who he falls in love with. To raise money he becomes a boxer and enjoys such success that he restores the family fortune, and gets his father's blessing to his marriage to the actress.

Cast
 Herbert Rawlinson as Cecil Fitzhugh Waring
 Dorothy Manners as Teddi Walters
 Frank Currier as Teddi Walters Father
 Otis Harlan as 	Chewing Gum Baron
 Esther Ralston as 	Chewing Gum Baron's Daughter
 Eddie Gribbon as Porky Schaup, Boxer
 Tom McGuire as Jacky Williams

References

Bibliography
 Connelly, Robert B. The Silents: Silent Feature Films, 1910-36, Volume 40, Issue 2. December Press, 1998.
 Munden, Kenneth White. The American Film Institute Catalog of Motion Pictures Produced in the United States, Part 1. University of California Press, 1997.

External links
 

1923 films
1923 comedy films
1920s sports comedy films
1920s English-language films
American silent feature films
American boxing films
American sports comedy films
Films directed by Edward Laemmle
American black-and-white films
Universal Pictures films
1920s American films
Silent American comedy films
Films with screenplays by Richard Schayer
Silent sports comedy films